The Wallace Clark Award or Wallace Clark Medal is a former management award for Distinguished Contribution to Scientific Management, named after Henry Wallace Clark (1880-1948). The Wallace Clark Award was established in 1949 and was sponsored by the American Management Association (AMA), the American Society of Mechanical Engineers (ASME), the Association for Consulting Management Engineers and the Society for the Advancement of Management.

The first Wallace Clark Medal was in 1948 awarded in the Swiss Hugo de Haan, who was in those days executive secretary of Comite International de l'Organisation Scientifique (CIOS). This organization was dedicated to the promotion of scientific management worldwide, and was founded in the first International Management Congress at Prague in 1924.

Award winners 

 1949. Hugo de Haan
 1950. Theodore Limperg
 1951. Lillian Gilbreth
 1953. Erwin H. Schell
 1954. Harold Bright Maynard
 1955. Lyndall Urwick 
 1957. Walter Scott
 1958. Harold F. Smiddy 
 1960. Berend Willem Berenschot 
 1963. Peter Drucker 
 1965. Phil Carroll
 1966. K. S. Basu
 1967. Joseph M. Juran 
 1968. Gerrit van der Wal
 1969. Dwayne Orton

References 

Awards established in 1949
Management awards